Une double famille (A Second Home) is a lengthy short story by Honoré de Balzac. The story first appeared in 1830 under the title La femme vertueuse (The Virtuous Woman). It was subsequently published in 1832 by Mame et Delaunay as part of Balzac's Scènes de la vie privée (Scenes from Private Life). In 1835 it appeared, in an edition by Madame Béchet, in the collection Études de mœurs (Studies of Manners). The novel only acquired its present title in 1842, when the fifth edition appeared in Volume I of the Scenes from Private Life, which was also the first volume of Balzac's La Comédie humaine.

The novel comprises two parts, two stories, which are really two sides of the same story. The plot revolves around an act of adultery - a double life, a second family - which is in some sense justified. From the beginning, the setting recalls the atmosphere of Balzac's Ferragus. In a squalid house, in a sordid neighbourhood, an old woman offers an angelic creature - her own daughter - to passers by. The Comte de Granville, unhappily married to a sanctimonious woman, falls in love with this grisette. An aristocrat and a magistrate of integrity, he had made a name for himself in the Gondreville affair, which Balzac would later recount in Une ténébreuse affaire (A Murky Affair).

In this work, the author protests against the excesses of bigotry and, according to a principle dear to him, he contrasts the interior design of an aristocratic house with both the grime of a squalid Parisian neighbourhood and the cheerful décor of a grisette's apartment (another familiar theme in the works of Balzac). Madame du Granville's home is, in his eyes: a place of cold, arid solemnity, of moral rectitude and narrow-mindedness. Whereas the grisette's flat, like that of La Torpille (Esther Van Gobseck), is a place of delights.

Plot 
Caroline Crochard, a delightful young girl living with her mother in squalid conditions, spends her time sewing in the window. The Comte de Granville, an aristocrat who was married at too young an age to a bigoted woman, and who is now unhappy in his home, sees the girl and falls in love with her. Balzac takes up their story some years later. Caroline is now richly installed in a luxurious apartment with two children, whose father, known to Caroline as Roger de Granville, cannot acknowledge them on account of his marriage. Eventually Caroline abandons de Granville and takes up with an impoverished young man, who squanders her property.

Commentary 
The author of La Comédie humaine once again employs the technique of the retrospective illumination when in Une ténébreuse affaire, which Balzac began to write in 1839, we are given a glimpse of the professional and political side of de Granville's life - the upright magistrate, who reappears in Splendeurs et misères des courtisanes (Scenes from a Courtesan's Life) of 1838.

Criticism 
This story can be considered a minor work of Balzac, who is not particularly known for his achievements in the genre of melodrama. His talent as a portraitist, however, shines through in the character of Caroline, a talent he displayed and refined throughout the writing of La Comédie humaine.

See also

 Repertory of the Comedie Humaine

External links

 A Second Home at Project Gutenberg
 Original French text of A Second Home
  Une double famille, audio version 

1830 French novels
Books of La Comédie humaine
Novels set in Paris
Novellas by Honoré de Balzac